Zhang Zhen (5 October 1914 – 3 September 2015) was a general of the People's Liberation Army of China and a member of the Central Military Commission of the Chinese Communist Party.

Biography
Zhang was born in Pingjiang County, Hunan Province, with Hakka ancestry from Pingyuan County, Guangdong Province. His original name was Zhang Jiansheng, also named as Zhang Zushou, Zhang Zhongtian. He joined the Communist Youth League in April 1930, and the Chinese Communist Party that summer.

From 1957–66, Zhang was vice president, and later president of PLA Nanjing Military Academy. Purged during the Cultural Revolution, he was rehabilitated in 1975 and appointed  vice director, and later director of the PLA General Logistics Department, and a member of the CCP Central Military Commission. From 1980–85, he was the vice chief of staff in PLA General Staff Department. From 1985–90, he served as the president of National Defense University.

In 1990, Zhang became president, political commissar and CCP chief of the PLA National Defense University. He was an alternate member of the 11th CCP central committee, and a full member of the 12th CCP central committee. He celebrated his 100th birthday in October 2014 and died on September 3, 2015, just over a month before his 101st birthday.

Children
Zhang Xiaoyang, major general, former Dean of PLA University of Foreign Language
Zhang Lianyang, major general, former Director of Military Representative Office of People's Liberation Army General Staff Department
Zhang Haiyang, general, former political commissar of the PLA Second Artillery Corps
Zhang Ningyang, major general, former vice minister of Military Transportation Department of the PLA General Logistics Department

References

External links

 Biography of Zhang Zhen

People's Liberation Army generals from Hunan
1914 births
2015 deaths
Chinese centenarians
Men centenarians
Chinese Communist Party politicians from Hunan
People's Republic of China politicians from Hunan
Hakka people
Hakka generals
Politicians from Yueyang
People's Liberation Army General Logistics Department